Schafberg (1,783 m) is a mountain in the Austrian state of Salzburg.  Situated within the Salzkammergut Mountains range of the Northern Limestone Alps, the Schafberg rises at the shore of Wolfgangsee Lake.

Tourism

During the summer, the Schafbergbahn, a rack railway that opened in 1893, runs from the small town of St. Wolfgang im Salzkammergut on the shores of the Wolfgangsee to the summit. The peak offers a panoramic view of the Salzkammergut mountains and its lakes and is also the site of a hotel called Schafbergspitze, established in 1862.

Gallery

References

External links

Mountains of the Alps
Mountains of Salzburg (state)